Arturo Tabera Araoz  (29 October 1903 – 13 June 1975) was a Spanish cardinal of the Catholic Church who served as Prefect of the Sacred Congregation for Religious and Secular Institutes.

Early years
Arturo Tabera Araoz was born in Barco, near Ávila, Spain. He joined the Congregation of Sons of the Immaculate Heart of Mary in May 1915. He was educated at the Claretian Seminary, and the Pontifical Roman Athenaeum "S. Apollinare" in Rome where he earned a doctorate in canon law.

Priesthood 
He was ordained on 22 December 1928. He was from 1930 until 1946 a faculty member of the Theological School of Zafra, Badajoz; director of the journal Ilustración del Clero, Madrid; staff member of the journal Commemoratium pro religiosis, Rome; secretary of the prefecture of studies of his congregation; founder of the journal Vida religiosa, Rome; vice-postulator of the cause of beatification of Marcelo Spinola y Maestre, Archbishop of Seville.

Episcopate 
Pope Pius XII appointed him titular bishop of Lirbe and apostolic administrator of Barbastro, Spain, on 16 February 1946. He was transferred to the diocese of Albacete on 13 May 1950. He attended the Second Vatican Council in Rome. He was promoted to the metropolitan see of Pamplona by Pope Paul VI on 23 July 1968.

Cardinalate 
He was made Cardinal-Priest of San Pietro in Montorio in the consistory of 28 April 1969 by Pope Paul. He was appointed Prefect of the Congregation for Divine Worship on 20 February 1971. Pope Paul appointed him prefect of the Sacred Congregation for Religious and Secular Institutes on 8 September 1973.

He died in 1975 in Rome.

References

1903 births
1975 deaths
20th-century Spanish cardinals
Tabora Araoz, Arturo
Members of the Congregation for Institutes of Consecrated Life and Societies of Apostolic Life
Officials of the Roman Curia
Cardinals created by Pope Paul VI
People from Ávila, Spain